Caulastrocecis furfurella is a moth of the family Gelechiidae. It is found in Austria, Italy, the Czech Republic, Slovakia, Romania, Ukraine, Russia and Kazakhstan.

The wingspan is 13–16 mm. The ground colour of the forewings ranges from whitish to yellowish with dark scales. The hindwings are whitish.

References

Moths described in 1871
Caulastrocecis
Moths of Europe